Pavel Grigorievich Talalay (Russian: Павел Григорьевич Талалай) (born October 14, 1962), is a Russian professor of drilling engineering and director of the Institute for Polar Science and Engineering in Jilin University, Changchun, China. His research interests are focused on different features of drilling technology in ice and permafrost; dynamics of ice sheets; ice properties and environmental issues in Polar Regions.

Career 
Talalay acquired Drilling Engineer (1984), Ph.D. (1995) and Doctor of Engineering (2007) degrees at the St. Petersburg Mining University of Russia, where he has also worked as Professor and Chair of Department of Descriptive Geometry and Engineering Drawing. Talalay was a guest Researcher in the Niels Bohr University of Copenhagen, Denmark (1998-1999). In 2010, Talalay was invited to work at Jilin University within the framework of the Chinese state program “Attracting 1000 highly qualified specialists”. Later, Talalay became the Director of the Polar Research Center of Jilin University. Additionally, Talalay was a member of IDDO Technical Advisory Board of the University of Wisconsin, Madison, USA (2009-2017). Talalay is the author of over 170 publication, 50 patents, and 16 books and book-chapters, most notable of which are Mechanical Ice Drilling Technology, Thermal Ice Drilling Technology and Geotechnical and Exploration Drilling in the Polar Regions.

Expeditions in Antarctica and the Arctic 

Talalay participated in six field expeditions in Antarctica and the Arctic. In 1999-2001 he took part in the North Greenland Ice-core Project (NorthGRIP) yielded the deepest borehole in Greenland Ice Sheet (3085 m; 2003). He has been a part in a Russian project to create deepest borehole in ice at Vostok station, Antarctica that contacted in February 2012 with the Subglacial Lake Vostok at a depth 3769.3 m. In 2019, Talalay lead a research project that yielded the first bedrock sample beneath East Antarctica, near the Zhongshan station, in more than 60 years.

Awards and recognition 
Talalay was awarded the Second-Class Diploma of IV All-Russian context of science-popular articles “Science-Society-2005”, 2006 International Geneva Salon of Inventions Gold Medal, won the 2009 International Contest on 3D-Moldelling. In 2014, he was awarded Chinese Government's Friendship Award for “outstanding contribution to the country's economic and social progress”.

References 

1962 births
Living people